is a railway station in Chūō, Tokyo, Japan.
The station opened on July 15, 1972.

Lines
East Japan Railway Company
Sōbu Line (Rapid)

Passengers can transfer to:
Higashi-nihombashi Station on the Toei Asakusa Line
Bakuro-yokoyama Station on the Toei Shinjuku Line

Layout
The underground station has one island platform serving two tracks.

Surrounding area
 Higashi-nihombashi Station ( Toei Asakusa Line)
 Bakuro-yokoyama Station ( Toei Shinjuku Line)
 Train Hostel Hokutosei

References

External links 

Station information by JR East 

Railway stations in Japan opened in 1972
Railway stations in Tokyo
Nihonbashi, Tokyo